GLPI (acronym: , or "Free IT Equipment Manager" in English) is an open source IT Asset Management, issue tracking system and service desk system. This software is written in PHP and distributed as open-source software under the GNU General Public License.

GLPI is a web-based application helping companies to manage their information system. The solution is able to build an inventory of all the organization's assets and to manage administrative and financial tasks. The system's functionalities help IT Administrators to create a database of technical resources, as well as a management and history of maintenances actions. Users can declare incidents or requests (based on asset or not) thanks to the Helpdesk feature.

History 
The GLPI Community based-project started in 2003 and was directed by the INDEPNET association. Through the years, GLPI became widely used by both communities and companies, leading to a need of professional services around the system. Whereas the INDEPNET Association did not intend to offer services around the software, in 2008 the Association created a Partners' Network in order to achieve various objectives:

The first objective was to build an ecosystem where Partners could participate in GLPI Project. Secondly, Partners would financially support the association, in order to ensure the necessary software development. And finally, the ecosystem would guarantee a service delivery through a known and identified Network, directly connected to INDEPNET.

In 2009, Teclib’ started to integrate the software, developed the GLPI code and  implemented new features. During summer 2015, the GLPI's Community leaders decided to transfer the roadmap management and the development leadership to Teclib’, so that Teclib´becomes editor of the GLPI system ensuring the software R&D.

The code remains under a GPL license and keeps its open source nature. The GLPI system continues to be improved thanks to the co-partnership between the community and the editor.

Timeline

Software development
GLPI Project is an open source and collaborative community of developers and IT experts gathered to develop the GLPI software. This collaboration is achieved by different means: installation and use of GLPI, GLPI tests, upgrades submissions, documentation participations, translations, features request.

Major releases 
Since 2003, GLPI has been developed through more than 80 versions. Major releases include:

Software overview 
As an  ITSM software, the main features of GLPI are the following: 
  Multi-entity management 
  Multilingual management and support (45 languages available)
  Multi user support and Multiple Authentication System
 Administrative and Financial management 
  Inventory functionalities
  Incident and request management tracking and monitoring features
  Problem and change management
 Licenses management (ITIL compliant)  
  Assignment of equipment: location, users and groups
  Simplified interface to allow end users to fill a support ticket
 Asset and helpdesk reports: hardware, network or interventions (support)

Specific features 

Moreover, GLPI has many plugins that add further features.

Distribution 
GLPI Software can be installed and set up in two different ways, either through the community forge or through a professional network.

Technologies used 
GLPI is using the following technologies:
 PHP 7.4 or higher
 MySQL / MariaDB regarding the database
 HTML for the Web pages 
 JavaScript for some core functionalities
 CSS respecting style sheets 
 XML for report generation

See also 

 IT asset management
 Issue tracking system
 Comparison of help desk issue tracking software
 Comparison of ticket-tracking systems
 Service desk
 OCS Inventory

References

Further reading

External links
 

Free network-related software
Help desk software
Bug and issue tracking software
Free software programmed in PHP